Brandon-on-the-Dan is a historic estate at 1072 Calvary Road (Virginia State Route 119), overlooking the Dan River in rural western Halifax County, Virginia.  The estate includes an early log house, and a c. 1855 Greek Revival wood-frame main house that received an extensive Craftsman-style alteration in 1915 by North Carolina master craftsman Thomas Day.  The  also includes a large African-American cemetery, and a log tobacco barn; the latter is distinctive as an example of modern log construction.

The property was listed on the National Register of Historic Places in 2017.

See also
National Register of Historic Places listings in Halifax County, Virginia

References

Houses on the National Register of Historic Places in Virginia
Greek Revival architecture in Virginia
Houses completed in 1839
Houses in Halifax County, Virginia
National Register of Historic Places in Halifax County, Virginia
Historic districts in Virginia